The Odumase dynasty is the reigning royal house of the Manya Krobo Traditional Area in the Eastern Region of Ghana. The monarch of the Odumase dynasty is the konor, or paramount chief.

References 

History of Ghana